Beaver Creek is a stream in the U.S. state of Idaho. It is a tributary of Rock Creek.

Beaver Creek was named for the abundance of beavers in the creek.

References

Rivers of Fremont County, Idaho
Rivers of Idaho